Yeshayahu Gavish (born August 25, 1925) is a retired Israel Defense Forces Major General known for leading the IDF forces in the Sinai Peninsula front during the Six-Day War.

Early life
Gavish was born and raised in Tel Aviv. He studied at the school for worker's children in northern Tel Aviv and at a school in kibbutz Givat HaShlosha.

Military career
Gavish joined the Palmach at age 18. He took part in the Night of the Bridges in 1946. During 1948 Arab–Israeli War, Gavish fought in the Palmach under Yigal Allon. Following the war, he stayed in the Israel Defense Forces and rose through the ranks.

Between 1965–1969, he was chief commander of the Southern Command. During his military career, he led the Israeli offensive on the Egyptian forces in Sinai during the Six Day War. Although the ground campaign was very successful, his subordinated divisional commanders, generals Israel Tal and Ariel Sharon, had received more praise than him.

References

1925 births
Living people
Israel Prize for special contribution to society and the State recipients
Israeli generals
Israeli Jews
Israeli people of the Six-Day War
Israeli people of the Yom Kippur War
People from Tel Aviv